Goes is a railway station located in Goes, the Netherlands. The station was opened on 1 July 1868 and is located on the Roosendaal–Vlissingen railway.

There is a train service on Sundays and Holidays between April and October, and Sundays to Fridays in July and August.

Train service
The following services currently call at Goes:
2x per hour intercity service Amsterdam - Haarlem - Leiden - The Hague - Rotterdam - Dordrecht - Roosendaal - Vlissingen (local service between Roosendaal and Vlissingen)
2x per weekday intercity service Roosendaal - Vlissingen (express service between Roosendaal and Vlissingen in the peak direction, only stopping at Middelburg, Goes and Bergen op Zoom. Splits from/Combines with the regular Amsterdam - Vlissingen intercity service at Roosendaal)

References

External links
NS website 
Dutch Public Transport journey planner 
Stoomtrein Goes-Borsele website

Railway stations in Zeeland
Railway stations opened in 1868
Railway stations on the Staatslijn F
Transport in Goes